Joseph Voyame (1923–2010) was a Swiss jurist.

1923 births
2010 deaths
Swiss jurists
Swiss Roman Catholics
Swiss officials of the United Nations
Academic staff of the University of Lausanne